Piñata is the second full-length album from Mexican Institute of Sound. It has samples of Mexican and Latin American folk music.

Track listing
 Killer Kumbia
 Escribeme Pronto ("Write Me Soon")
 El Micrófono ("The Microphone")
 Para No Vivir Desesperado ("To Not Live Desperately")
 La Kebradita ("The Quebradita")
 A Girl Like You
 A Todos Ellos ("To All Them")
 Hip Hop No Pares ("Hip Hop Don't Stop")
 Katia, Tania, Paulina y la Kim
 Belludita ("Hairy Little Girl")
 Mi Negra a Bailal ("Let's Dance, My Black Little girl")
 La la Meda ("The Grove")
 La Kebradita (Le Hammond Inferno Mix by Holger)
 La Paz la Luz (bonus track) ("The Peace, The Light")
 Por Mi Raza Hablará el Espíritu (bonus track) ("For My Race, My Soul Will Speak")
 Big Faint (ft. Kuase Nada) (bonus track)

References

External links
MIS on MySpace

2007 albums
Mexican Institute of Sound albums